Umm an Nasan island is the fifth largest island in Bahrain.

Description
Umm an Nasan is privately owned by Prime Minister Khalifa bin Salman Al Khalifa, and is off limits to ordinary citizens. 
There is little development on the island other than three palaces for the King and some gardens. There is also a small population of black buck introduced to the island.
The small Umm an Nasan village is located on the west coast, and has some nomadic families which care for the deer and gazelles of the island.

Geography
Umm an Nasan lies in the Gulf of Bahrain in Persian Gulf to the west of Bahrain Island, and to the east of the Saudi coastal city of Khobar.

Administration
The island belongs to Northern Governorate.
 North Palace
 Southwest Palace
 Palace at the Sea
 Umm an Nasan village
 Security village

Transportation
Umm an Nasan is connected to Bahrain Island and to Khobar, Saudi Arabia through the King Fahd Causeway. 
Umm an Nasan is connected to Jidda Island through the Jidda Causeway.

Image gallery

References 
 Article about politics of the island, Abbas al Murshid

Populated places in the Northern Governorate, Bahrain
Islands of Bahrain
Islands of the Persian Gulf